Gjergjan is a village and a former municipality in the Elbasan County, central Albania. At the 2015 local government reform it became a subdivision of the municipality Elbasan. The population at the 2011 census was 5,126. The municipal unit consists of the villages Bujares, Gjonme, Gjergjan, Keshtjelle, Koder Bujares, Muriqan and Thane.

References 

Former municipalities in Elbasan County
Administrative units of Elbasan
Villages in Elbasan County